Francis Joseph O'Rourke (21 January 1906 – 7 March 1978) was an Australian rules footballer who played with Carlton and Fitzroy in the Victorian Football League (VFL).

Family
One of the ten children of Joseph Francis O'Rourke (1868-1951), and Maria Mary "Polly" O'Rourke, née Dunne (1867-1933), Francis Joseph O'Rourke was born in Colac, Victoria on 21 January 1906.

His older brother, Jack O'Rourke, played for St Kilda and Fitzroy.

Notes

External links 
 

Frank O'Rourke's playing statistics from The VFA Project
Frank O'Rourke's profile at Blueseum

1906 births
Australian rules footballers from Victoria (Australia)
Koroit Football Club players
Carlton Football Club players
Fitzroy Football Club players
Preston Football Club (VFA) players
Port Melbourne Football Club players
1978 deaths